Thomas James Hunter, CM, O.Ont (born March 20, 1937) is a Canadian country music performer, known as "Canada's Country Gentleman".

Career
In 1956, he began performing as a rhythm guitarist on the CBC Television show, Country Hoedown. The Tommy Hunter Show began as a CBC Radio program in 1960, replacing the long-running variety show The Happy Gang, and went on to replace Country Hoedown on CBC Television in 1965; Hunter's show was picked up by TNN in 1983 and ran on CBC until 1992. Performers on the show included singer-songwriter Gordon Lightfoot in the early years of his own musical career. 

The book Cue the Elephant by Knowlton Nash (1996, McClelland & Stewart) featured some disparaging remarks from the show's make-up artist. "He could sell himself terrifically but there was no love lost between Tommy and the crew. Some of the guys loathed him ... Everybody made snide remarks behind Tommy's back ... people might say he was the biggest jerk in the world. But that was not my experience. For me, I saw a very easy down-to-earth manner. But Tommy does generate anti as well as pro feelings from people ... he didn't trust people around him, he became a monster to some."

People who performed on The Tommy Hunter Show early in their careers include:
Garth Brooks
Shania Twain, then known as Eileen Twain
The Judds
Alanis Morissette, when she was a country singer
Yvonne Murray

After his show was cancelled by the CBC, Hunter continued to tour with his band, The Travelling Men. He retired after his final tour in 2012.

Awards and recognition
Hunter was inducted into the Canadian Country Music Hall of Fame in 1984. In 1986, Hunter was made a Member of the Order of Canada. He has received three Canadian Juno Awards and one Gemini Award. In 1990, he was given a place in the Country Music Hall of Fame's "Walkway of Stars". A street ("Tommy Hunter Way") was also renamed in his honour in his hometown of London, Ontario, in the late 1990s. He became a member of the Order of Ontario in 1996. In 2005 he was honored with a GMA Canada Lifetime Achievement Award. The award is handed out annually by the Gospel Music Association of Canada.

Tommy Hunter received the Queen Elizabeth II Golden Jubilee Medal in 2002 and the Queen Elizabeth II Diamond Jubilee Medal in 2012.

Discography

Albums

Singles

References

External links
 
 
 The Canadian Encyclopedia: Tommy Hunter

1937 births
Living people
Canadian country singers
Canadian television variety show hosts
Juno Award winners
Members of the Order of Canada
Members of the Order of Ontario
Musicians from London, Ontario